Mike DeBord (born February 7, 1956) is an American football coach who was most recently the offensive coordinator at the University of Kansas. He was previously the offensive coordinator of the San Diego Fleet of the Alliance of American Football (AAF), and was the associate head coach and offensive coordinator at Indiana University prior to joining the AAF. DeBord was the head football coach at Central Michigan University from 2000 to 2003, compiling a record of 12–34. He worked as an assistant coach at the University of Michigan for a total of 11 seasons, from 1993 to 1999 and again from 2004 to 2007. He was the offensive coordinator for the Michigan Wolverines for five seasons (1997–1999, 2006–2007) including Michigan's 1997 campaign, in which the team won part of a national championship. DeBord has also worked as an assistant coach in the National Football League (NFL), with the Seattle Seahawks (2008–2009) and the Chicago Bears (2010–2012).

Playing career
DeBord graduated from Wes-Del High School in Delaware County, Indiana. He started for four years on the offensive line at Manchester College, receiving all-conference, all-district and honorable mention NAIA All-America honors during the 1977 season when he was captain. DeBord later earned a master's degree from Ball State in 1981. He was inducted into the Indiana Football Hall of Fame in 1995.

Coaching career

Early years
In 1982, DeBord embarked on a coaching career that included stops at Franklin College, Fort Hays State University, Eastern Illinois University, Ball State University, Colorado State University and Northwestern University before joining the Michigan staff under head coach Gary Moeller.

First stint at Michigan
At Michigan, he served as offensive line coach from 1992 to 1996. In 1997, he was promoted to offensive coordinator. During DeBord's first year as offensive coordinator in 1997, Michigan won their first national championship since 1948.

Central Michigan
DeBord was hired as the head football coach at Central Michigan by athletic director Herb Deromedi in 2000. He would go on to post a 12–34 record, resigning after the 2003 season. DeBord never won more than four games in a season in his time at Central Michigan.

Assistant coach

Return to Michigan
DeBord rejoined the Wolverines in 2004 as special teams and recruiting coordinator for head coach Lloyd Carr, taking over the role filled by the retiring Bobby Morrison.  DeBord served in that capacity for two seasons before succeeding Terry Malone as offensive coordinator and tight ends coach in 2006. Malone had previously replaced DeBord when DeBord took the head coaching job at Central Michigan in 2000.

DeBord was a candidate for the head coaching position at Michigan following the retirement of Lloyd Carr in 2007.  The job ultimately went to Rich Rodriguez, who fired all Michigan assistant coaches except running backs coach Fred Jackson. As the offensive coordinator at Michigan, DeBord posted a 52–11 regular season record and a post season record of 4–1.

NFL
On March 5, 2008, the Seattle Seahawks announced that DeBord had been hired as the assistant offensive line coach. DeBord was promoted to tight end coach for the 2009 season.

On February 2, 2010, the Chicago Bears announced DeBord as their new tight ends coach, after coming to terms for the 2010 season. DeBord was dismissed by new head coach Marc Trestman on January 17, 2013.

Tennessee
On February 5, 2015, DeBord was hired by Tennessee head coach Butch Jones as offensive coordinator, replacing Mike Bajakian, who left to become quarterbacks coach for the Tampa Bay Buccaneers. Jones had previously worked under DeBord as an assistant coach at Central Michigan. On January 3, 2017, it was announced that DeBord would be leaving Tennessee to become the offensive coordinator for Indiana.

Indiana
On January 4, 2017, Indiana head coach Tom Allen hired DeBord as offensive coordinator, replacing Kevin Johns, who departed the position for offensive coordinator and quarterbacks coach with the Western Michigan Broncos. On December 30, 2018, DeBord announced his retirement from football.

San Diego Fleet
In January 2019, San Diego Fleet offensive coordinator Jon Kitna departed the team to become quarterbacks coach of the Dallas Cowboys. To take his place, the Fleet hired DeBord, reuniting him with Fleet head coach and former Bears colleague Mike Martz.

Third stint at Michigan
DeBord rejoined the Michigan football team on March 4, 2020 as an offensive analyst under head coach Jim Harbaugh.

Kansas
DeBord was hired as the offensive coordinator for Kansas on February 2, 2021. He was not retained when Les Miles was fired in March and replaced by Buffalo head coach Lance Leipold.

Sports administration
On February 1, 2013, DeBord was hired by Michigan athletic director Dave Brandon to be the sports administrator for the school's Olympic sports teams.  In this role he works with the field hockey, men's and women's cross country, men's and women's gymnastics, men's and women's track and field, and men's and women's tennis programs.

Head coaching record

References

1956 births
Living people
American football offensive linemen
Ball State Cardinals football coaches
Central Michigan Chippewas football coaches
Colorado State Rams football coaches
Chicago Bears coaches
Eastern Illinois Panthers football coaches
Fort Hays State Tigers football coaches
Franklin Grizzlies football coaches
Indiana Hoosiers football coaches
Manchester Spartans football players
Michigan Wolverines football coaches
Northwestern Wildcats football coaches
San Diego Fleet coaches
Seattle Seahawks coaches
Tennessee Volunteers football coaches
Sportspeople from Muncie, Indiana
Coaches of American football from Indiana
Players of American football from Indiana